Novlenskoye is a rural locality (a selo) and the administrative center of Novlenskoye Rural Settlement, Vologodsky District, Vologda Oblast, Russia. The population was 825 as of 2002. There are 16 streets.

Geography 
Novlenskoye is located next to Lake Kubenskoye. Novlenskoye is located 58 km northwest of Vologda (the district's administrative centre) by road. Dmitriyevskoye is the nearest rural locality.

References 

Rural localities in Vologodsky District
Vologodsky Uyezd